Alphonso Johnson (born February 2, 1951) is an American jazz bassist active since the early 1970s. Johnson was a member of the jazz fusion group Weather Report from 1973 to 1975, and has performed and recorded with numerous high-profile rock and jazz acts including Santana, Phil Collins, members of the Grateful Dead, Steve Kimock, and Chet Baker.

Biography
Born in Philadelphia, Pennsylvania, United States, Johnson started off as an upright bass player, but switched to the electric bass in his late teens. Beginning his career in the early 1970s, Johnson showed innovation and fluidity on the electric bass. He sessioned with a few jazz musicians before landing a job with Weather Report, taking over for co-founding member Miroslav Vitous. Johnson debuted with Weather Report on the album Mysterious Traveller.  He appeared on two more Weather Report albums: Tale Spinnin' (1975) and Black Market (1976) before he left the band to work with drummer Billy Cobham. During 1976-77 he recorded three solo albums as a band leader, for the Epic label, in a fusion-funk vein.

Johnson was one of the first musicians to introduce the Chapman Stick to the public. In 1977, his knowledge of the instrument offered him a rehearsal with Genesis, who were looking for a replacement for guitarist Steve Hackett. Being more of a bassist than a guitarist, Johnson instead recommended his friend ex-Sweetbottom guitarist and fellow session musician Daryl Stuermer, who would go on to remain a member of Genesis's touring band until the band's final concert in 2022.

Johnson was one of two bass players on Phil Collins's first solo album, Face Value, in 1981.

In early 1982, Johnson joined Grateful Dead member Bob Weir's side project Bobby and the Midnites. He would reunite with Weir in 2000, playing bass in place of Phil Lesh on tour with The Other Ones. He has also performed fusion versions of Grateful Dead songs alongside Billy Cobham in the band Jazz Is Dead.

In 1996, Johnson played bass on tracks "Dance on a Volcano" and "Fountain of Salmacis" on Steve Hackett's Genesis Revisited album.

Later in 1996, Johnson toured Europe and Japan with composer and saxophonist Wayne Shorter, pianist James Beard, drummer Rodney Holmes, and guitarist David Gilmore.

He has an extensive experience as a bass teacher and has conducted bass seminars and clinics in Germany, England, France, Scotland, Ireland, Japan, Switzerland, Australia, Brazil and Argentina.

Johnson started his college education at Pierce College, and then transferred to California State University, Northridge, where he earned a Bachelor of Arts in Music Education in 2014. As an undergraduate student, Johnson performed as a member of the CSUN Wind Ensemble. He pursued his graduate degree at CSU Northridge, earning a Master of Arts in Secondary Curriculum and Instruction in 2021. He serves as an adjunct instructor at the University of Southern California and the California Institute of the Arts.

Equipment

Electric basses 
 Fender Precision, extensively modified
 Chapman Stick
 Lobue Custom
 Warwick Alphonso Johnson Custom Shop Bass Guitar
 Warwick Infinity
 Vigier Arpege 5 fretless
 Modulus Quantum 5 String Fretted and Fretless Bass

Acoustic basses
 Washburn AB45

Discography

As leader
 Moonshadows (Epic, 1976)
 Yesterday's Dreams (Epic, 1976) 
 Spellbound (Epic, 1977)

As member 
Weather Report
 Mysterious Traveller (Columbia, 1974)
 Tale Spinnin' (Columbia, 1975)
 Black Market (Columbia, 1976)

Santana
 Beyond Appearances (Columbia, 1985)
 Freedom (Columbia, 1987)
 Spirits Dancing in the Flesh (Columbia, 1990)

Jazz Is Dead
 Blue Light Rain (Zebra, 1998)
 Laughing Water (Zebra, 1999) – live
 Great Sky River (Zebra, 2001) – live
 Grateful Jazz (Pet Peev, 2015) – recorded in 2004

As sideman 
With Bob Weir
 Bobby and the Midnites (Arista, 1981)
 Where the Beat Meets the Street (Columbia, 1984)

With others
 Chet Baker, You Can't Go Home Again (Horizon, 1977)
 Dee Dee Bridgewater, Just Family (Elektra, 1977)
 George Cables, Shared Secrets (MuseFX, 2001)
 Phil Collins, Face Value (Virgin, 1981)
 George Duke, Liberated Fantasies (MPS, 1976)
 George Duke-Billy Cobham Band, "Live" on Tour in Europe (Atlantic, 1976)
 Steve Hackett, Genesis Revisited (Camino, 1996)
 Eddie Henderson, Sunburst (Blue Note, 1975)
 Allan Holdsworth, Velvet Darkness (CTI, 1976)
 Chuck Mangione, Land of Make Believe (Mercury, 1973)
 Hermeto Pascoal, Slaves Mass (Warner Bros., 1977)
 Abraxas Pool, Abraxas Pool (Miramar, 1997)
 Flora Purim, Open Your Eyes You Can Fly (Milestone, 1976)
 Carlos Santana and Wayne Shorter, Live at the 1988 Montreux Jazz Festival '' (Image Entertainment, 2005)

References

External links 

 
 'Ep. 45: Alphonso Johnson, bassist from the Weather Report' Interview by Tigran Arakelyan

1951 births
Living people
American jazz bass guitarists
American session musicians
Chapman Stick players
Epic Records artists
Weather Report members
20th-century American bass guitarists
21st-century American bass guitarists
Guitarists from Philadelphia
American male bass guitarists
The Other Ones members
Bobby and the Midnites members
Jazz musicians from Pennsylvania
20th-century American male musicians
21st-century American male musicians
American male jazz musicians
Jazz Is Dead members
Catalyst (band) members